HMS Port Mahon has been the name of several ships of the British Royal Navy, and may refer to:

 , a 20-gun sixth rate launched in 1711 and scrapped in 1740
 , a 24-gun sixth rate launched in 1740 and sold in 1763
 , an 18-gun brig-sloop captured on the stocks in 1798, launched in 1798, hulked in 1817, and sold in 1837.

References
 

Royal Navy ship names